was a Japanese actor and voice actor.

Filmography

Acting roles
 Hidetaro in Akantare (xxxx)
 Lieutenant Commander Sasai in Samurai! (xxxx)
 Minamoto no Yoshitsune in Shin Heike Monogatari  (1972)
 Kusaka Genzui in Kashin (1977)

Voice roles
 André Grandier in The Rose of Versailles (xxxx)
 Franz, Fritz in Nutcracker Fantasy (xxxx)
 Saki Vashtal in Area 88 (OAV, xxxx)
 Soldier Blue in Toward the Terra (Movie, xxxx)
 Prince in Hans Christian Andersen's The Little Mermaid (1975)
 Siegfried in Swan Lake (1981)

Awards

References

External links
 

1951 births
2022 deaths
Japanese male voice actors
Place of birth missing